The following is a list of major junctions on New Zealand's State Highway 1 (SH 1).

North Island (SH 1N)

South Island (SH 1S)

Spur sections

SH 1B

SH 1C

See also
List of New Zealand state highways

1
1
Lists of roads in New Zealand